Ron Rowles (12 February 1928 in Wollongong, New South Wales - 3 June 2017) was an Australian rugby league footballer who played in the 1940s and 1950s, he was a goal-kicking  whose club career was played with the Manly-Warringah for whom he set a number of point-scoring records in the 1950s.

Playing career
Originally a Wollongong / Illawarra junior, Ron Rowles was to become one of the greatest point scorers for Sydney's Manly-Warringah club. He played in Manly's maiden grand final in 1951 and played five first grade seasons with the club between 1950–1954.

Point scoring records
He was the first Manly player to top 100 points in a season and was the season's leading point-scorer in four successive years; 1951 (11t, 83g - 199 pts), 1952 (8t, 77g - 178 pts), 1953 (8t, 64g - 152 pts) and 1954 (13t, 92g - 223 pts).

He scored a club record 30 points (4t, 9g) in a match against Canterbury in 1954. He starred in a Possibles vs. Probables trial for the 1948-49 Kangaroos, but it was 'a travesty that he never played for his state or Australia'.

He was the second highest point scorer in Manly-Warringah Sea Eagles history, scoring 842 points during his career at the club.

Ron Rowles was the father of the former rugby union and rugby league footballer Peter Rowles.

References 

1928 births
2017 deaths
Australian rugby league players
Country New South Wales rugby league team players
Manly Warringah Sea Eagles players
Rugby league players from Wollongong
Rugby league wingers